Pavlo Olehovych Chornomaz (born 8 July 1990) is a professional Ukrainian football midfielder who plays for FC Vorkuta in the Canadian Soccer League.

Career

Ukraine 
Chornomaz began his playing career in sports schools in Rivne, and then in Lutsk. He then joined the first team FC Volyn Lutsk in the Ukrainian First League in 2008. He made his first-team debut entering as a second-half substitute against FC Prykarpattya Ivano-Frankivsk on 4 May 2008. In 2009, he continued playing in the Ukrainian First League with Zirka Kirovohrad. After three seasons in Kirovohrad, he signed with league rivals Arsenal Bila Tserkva in 2012. 

He received a chance to play in the Ukrainian Premier League by returning to his former club Volyn Lutsk in 2014. During his second stint in Volyn, he failed to make a single appearance. In 2016, he returned to the second-tier league and signed with FC Ternopil. After the relegation of Ternopil, he played in the Ukrainian Amateur Football League with FC Dnister Zalishchyky in 2017. For the 2018 season, he played with FSK Crystal Chortkov.

Canada 
n 2019, he played abroad in the Canadian Soccer League with FC Vorkuta. In his debut season with Vorkuta, he assisted in securing the First Division title. The following season he featured in the CSL Championship final against Scarborough SC and contributed a goal in securing the championship. 

In the 2021 season, he assisted in securing Vorkuta's third regular-season title. In the opening round of the ProSound Cup tournament, he contributed a goal against the Serbian White Eagles which advanced Vorkuta to the finals. He helped Vorkuta win the ProSound Cup against Scarborough in a penalty shootout.

Honors
FC Vorkuta
 CSL Championship: 2020
 Canadian Soccer League First Division/Regular Season: 2019, 2021 
ProSound Cup: 2021

References

External links 
 Profile at Official FFU site 
 

1990 births
Living people
Ukrainian footballers
FC Volyn Lutsk players
FC Zirka Kropyvnytskyi players
FC Arsenal-Kyivshchyna Bila Tserkva players
Association football midfielders
FC Ternopil players
FC Dnister Zalishchyky players
FC Continentals players
Ukrainian First League players
Canadian Soccer League (1998–present) players